2703 may refer to:

2703 Rodari asteroid
Hirth 2703 two stroke aircraft engine
IBM 2703 non-programmable communications controller
The year in the 28th century